Michele Aerden is a dentist and was president of the FDI World Dental Federation from 2005 to 2007. She was the first woman ever to be elected president of this non-profit organization and worked to promote oral health within the World Health Organization and worldwide.

Youth, education, family 

Michèle Aerden was born in Hasselt, Belgium. She has been married to Guy Warlop since 1966 and has two sons, two daughters in law and five grandchildren.
At the age of 20, Michèle started and ran a small business with 13 employees in haute couture. She then closed her company and started dental studies at the age of 28.
In 1977, Michèle graduated with distinction in dental studies from the ULB, Université Libre de Bruxelles.

Dental career and national achievements 

Michèle practices in her own private dental clinic in Brussels, Belgium. She has been very involved in the Belgian Dental Association.

Activities in the national level:

Chambres Syndicales Dentaires which were created in 1994 by the merger of the two French speaking dental chambers:

- Councillor 1994–2016

- Vice- President 1995-1997 and 2000

- President 2003- 2004 (first woman president of a Dental  association in Belgium)

Conseil de l’Art Dentaire: advisory committee to the Minister of Health:

- Member 2013-2015: Member of the WG “Deontologie”

- Member 1999-2006

- Leader of the WG : Compétences particulières

International career 

Michèle Aerden was Vice-President and President of the Chambres Syndicales Dentaires. Her first international involvement was as the Belgian delegate to the FDI. She then served as the Chair of the Individual Members Committee and as a member of the Committee of Ethics from 1994 to 1997. In the FDI European Regional Organization, she was the founder and leader of the working group on women in dentistry and a member of the working group on social security in Europe.
She became a member of the FDI Council in 1997, the second woman to be nominated to that position. She served as a member of the Committee of Developing Countries from 1998 to 2001 and was a member of the group strategy. She started Women Dentists Worldwide in 2001; this group published the Kuala Lumpur Declaration. In the FDI Council, she led the governance task force from 2003 to 2004 and became President-Elect in 2003 and President in 2005.

Activities on the international level:
               
FDI:  World Dental Federation, is a federation of 191 National and International associations from all over the world representing 1 million dentists. The Vision and Mission can be found on: www.fdiworldental.org

 2007–present: Honorary President FDI Section Women Dentists Worldwide
 2005-2007: President FDI  (first woman in 105 year of FDI)
 2003-2005: President-elect FDI 
 2002-2004: Chairman of the task team: “Governance”
 2001-2005: Leader of “Women Dentist Worldwide”
 2000-2001: Author of draft Statement  “Illegal Practice” adopted GA 2002
 1999-2000: Member of the WG Strategy “Mission to Action”
 1998-2001: Member of the Committee of Developing Countries
 1997-2007: Member of the FDI Council (second women in 97 years)
 1995-1997: Chairperson of the Forum of National Secretaries
 1994-1997: Chairperson of the Individual Members Committee
 1987-2005: National Secretary

ERO: European Regional Organisation of the FDI represents 40 European countries

 2014-2017: Member of WG "Quality of care"
 2011–present: Member of WG Integration
 1987- 2005; 2011-2017: Delegate for Belgium
 Member of the WG “Social Security in Europe”
 Leader of the WG “Women in Dentistry” 1996-2005

CED: Dental Liaison Committee of the European Commission (advisory committee founded by EU):

 2013–2016: Auditor
 1995-2006: Auditor
 1992-2005: Member of the Belgian delegation
 Member of the WG :European Health Policy in the new Millennium
 Member of the WG : Teeth bleaching

Vision for the World Dental Federation 

As a member of the Council, she was part of the Committee of developing countries and member of the Task Force “Strategy; From Mission to action”. During her period as President-Elect (2004–2005), Michèle centred her efforts with the review of  the FDI governance and finances. Consequently, the new governance was adopted and the constitution adapted. Under her Presidency, the FDI made had a positive balance sheet for the first time in ten years.

During her presidency, Michèle Aerden decided to be focus on 3 issues:
 Excellency
 Medical Positioning of the dental profession
 Ethics

1) Excellency
Excellency at all levels of the organization; the  FDI has performed exceptionally well during her tenure. The Annual World Dental Congresses organized by the FDI were very successfully. Policy Statements were reviewed, improved and renewed.
During the General Assembly of  2007, the FDI decided to implement the World Oral Health Day, which will be held on 12 September each year.

As President, Michèle Aerden gave a new positioning to the FDI President’s role. 
During each of her visits in nearly 60 countries, she consistently met the President of the country or the Prime Minister, and the Ministers of Health and sometimes Minister of Education in order to advocate for a strategy of Oral Health integrated into the strategy of General Health through prevention, planning and budget. “No general health without oral health !!” was her leitmotiv. She obtained tangible results during those visits and always received large media coverage.

2) Medical Positioning of the Profession 
Michèle Aerden is convinced that it is necessary to increase the recognition of the dental profession as a fully medical profession. Twice she introduced a candidate of the dental field for the Nobel Prize in Medicine. 
In 2007, for the first time in 26 years, a resolution concerning Oral health was on the agenda of the WHO. The resolution was adopted on 23 May 2007 by the 191 countries member of the WHO and the Director general of WHO, Dr Chan, recognized the urgency to acknowledge oral diseases and their impact on the socio-economic development of a country.

3) Ethics
Ethics are the foundation to the success of the dental profession and organisations. Without ethics, there's no trust nor credibility. 
It's under her presidency that the FDI launched the first “Dental Ethics Manual”. The FDI also launched conferences tackling ethics and its role in international health NGOs.

Travelling around the globe with the message ‘No general health without oral health» allows Michèle Aerden to meet and collaborate with exceptional personalities beyond the dental world: 
Professor Muhammad Yunus (micro credits) Dr Bertrand Piccard (ballooner) Madame WU Yi, (vice-President China Republic of people) Michelle Bachelet (President of Chilli) etc.

Through her 20 years of activities with the FDI, and certainly in the last two years as president, the contribution of Michèle Aerden to improving the quality of life and well-being of hundred of millions of people is recognized by her peers with numerous awards and also by the FDI partners and the dental industry.

Awards 

2008
 Honorary President Women Dentists Worldwide.

2007
 Award of FOLA, Federacion Odontologica Latin America (19 countries) for raising the level of Oral Health in Latin America.
Leadership Excellency by IDEM, International Dental Manufacturers for raising the level of Oral care worldwide
Honorary member of American Association Women Dentists

2006
Nominated “International Dentist of the Year 2006”  by the Academy of Dentist International, representing 89 countries
Honorary Fellowship of Pierre Fauchard Academy
Qana Scientific Award of the Libanese Dental Association
Honorary member of Cyprus Dental Association
Honorary member of Colegio Odontologico de Lima - Peru
Honoured by Associaçcao Brasileira de Odontologia seçao Minas Gerais - Brazil
Honoured by Federacion Odontologica Colombiana
Honoured by Academy Dentistry International section Peruvian
Certificate of Appreciation of Asian Pacific Dental Federation
Certificate of Appreciation of Sri Lanka Dental Association
Certificate of Appreciation of Collegio de Cirujano Dentistas de Chili
Registered by the Cyprus Dental Council as recognition for the work done in Cyprus

2005
Honorary  member of the Armenian Dental association

2004
Honorary member of the Associazione Italiana Odontoiatri
Honorary member of the International Dental Association
Citoyenne d’honneur de la ville de Paris (médaille vermeil)

2002
Honorary Member of the American Dental Association

Conferences 
Dr. Aerden has spoken at the following conferences:

Public Health

 2016 Almaty Kazakhstan  Modern aspects of a Dental Association. Dental development by NDAs 
 2015 St Petersburg, Russia "European standards of Continuing Dental Education and the vision of the futur of     
 the Dental profession"
 2014 Irkutsk, Siberia "European standards of Dental Education, the new EU directives"
 2013 Almaty, Kazakhstan:” Oral Health Indicators in Europe”
 2012 Moscow, Russia: “Futur Challenges for the Dental profession and associations in Europe”
 2010 Moscow: Russia: “Different Public Health concepts and Training models in Europe”
 2007 Geneva, Switzerland ;World Health Organisation “Role of a NGO in Oral health”
 2007 Beijing, China “The importance of prevention”
 2006 Cyprus; Introduction of Oral care in the Social Security
 2006 Lisbon, Portugal ; European Commission “Health Strategies in Europe”
 2006 Como, Italy, “Challenges for the Dental Profession in the 21st Century “
 2006 Lomé, Togo join WHO “Prevention in schools”
 2003 Delft,  Nederland Minister of Health “Health professionals in enlarged European Union“
 2003 Université de Lyon : “Role of European and World dental organizations in public  health”

Oral Health and General Health

 2018 Ulan Ude, Buryat Republic, "Impact of International organisations on the daily practice of each dentist"
 2017 Kyzyl Tuva Republic "FDI and you "
 2017 Crimea , Simferopol "Healthy school program"
 2017 Moscow, Russia " International organisations improving Oral Health and  Quality of Live"
 2015 Ulan Ude  Republic of Buryatya Leading the world to Optimal Oral Health
 2009 Istanbul, Turkey, “Oral Health integral part of General Health”
 2008 Bamako, Mali “Tabagisme ou Santé”
 2008 Tunis, Tunisie, “Tabac ou Santé”
 2007,Copenhague, Denmark, GA of the World Medical Association “Oral health integral part of general health”
 2007 Luanda, Angola; “Medecina Dentaria”
 2007 Sofia, Bulgaria: “Oral Health integral part of General Health”
 2007 Sun City,South Africa; “Oral Health integral part of General Health”
 2007 Cotonou,  Bénin 
 2007 Jakarta, Indonesia
 2006 Bogota, Colombia
 2006 Colombo, Sri Lanka “Oral Health integral part of General Health”
 2006 San Domingo, Republic Dominicana « Una salud bucodental y general óptima para toda la gente.
 2006 Karachi, Pakistan; 
 2006 Ouagadougou, Burkina Faso “Tabagisme ou Santé
 2006 Argentina
 2006 Beirout, Libanon “Oral Health integral part of General Health”
 2005 Budapest, Hungaria, Semmelweis University; Oral Health integral part of General Health
 2005 La Havana, Cuba Federation Odontologia Latino-america « Una salud bucodental y general óptima para toda la gente. »

Ethics

 2007 Toronto, Canada, International Dental Ethics and Law Congress “Role of a global federation and human rights”

Industry

 2008 Paris, France Comident “FDI, International Dental Federation, impact on the industry”
 2007 Brugge, Belgique; Association des Dépôts Dentaires Européens, ADDE; “ l’Impact et les Conséquences des Directives Européennes dans le Marché Intérieur »
 2006 Brussels Club Lorraine “A Healthy company start with a healthy smile”

Women in Dentistry, Women Leadership

 2015 Dublin  Ireland   "From haute couture to President of the FDI" 
 2010 Bahia, Brazil, American Dental Education Association “Women's Leadership, how you can and could  
 make a difference “
 2009 Singapore, “Women’s Leadership”
 2008 Stockholm, Sweden, “Women dentist Worldwide”
 2008 Bangkok, Thailand “Women dentist Worldwide”
 2008 Istanbul, Turkey, “Women dentist Worldwide”
 2007 Macau, China “Women’s Leadership”
 2007 Casablanca, Marocco, “Women dentist Worldwide
 2005 Montreal, Canada “Women Dentist Worldwide”
 2004 Bukarest, Roumania, “Women in Dentistry”
 2004 New Delhi, India; Women dentist Worldwide
 2001 Kuala Lumpur, Malaysia : Women dentist worldwide
 1998 Barcelone, Spain FDI congress “Lifting the ceiling in real time”
 1997 Istanbul, Turkey, European Regional Organisation :
 Women in Dentistry results of european survey (38 countries)
 1997 Goteborg, Sweden, ADEA (American Dental Education Association)”From haute couture to Dentistry”
 1995 Paris, France ADF Congress “Féminisation de la profession dentaire”

External links 

 ICD - International College of Dentists
 Health surveillance in Europe
 Integrating oral health Article in British Dental Journal
 FDI World Dental Federation
 Les droits de la personne et les soins buccodentaires
 Le Congrès mondial de la FDI
 Une sélection d'indicateurs essentiels en Santé bucco-dentaire
 Croatian scientific bibliography - Browsing paper
 From Haute Couture to FDI Presidency
  Academy of Dentistry International
 Actualités de la santé tropicale
 Journal of Dental Education, 2006 volume 70
 United States Public Health Service
 Blackwell Synergy - Int Nurs Rev, Volume 53
 Council of European Dentists on Health strategies in Europe
 Industry code of ethical conduct launched - Healthcare
 Woman Dentist Journal:Dental News Articles - AAWD News
 Evaluer pour Evoluer
 MedicalJournal
 International Perspectives
 DOHMS - Department of Health and Medical Services
 SÉNAT DE BELGIQUE
 Public Service - International Development Issue 5
 Woman Dentist Journal:Dental News Articles - Women's leadership
 PARTICIPANT LIST - HEALTH STRATEGIES IN EUROPE.XLS
 Interview for Tibetan Medicine Herald, Russia, 2017

Belgian dentists
Women dentists
Living people
Year of birth missing (living people)